Lac de Barterand is a lake in Pollieu, in the Ain department of France.

External links
   

Barterand